This is a list of notable persons who were born or spent important time in the American state of Minnesota. People not born in Minnesota are marked with §.

A

 Johan Arnd Aasgaard (1876–1966) – president, Concordia College; president, Norwegian Lutheran Church of America
 Barkhad Abdi § – actor
 Ed Ackerson (1965–2019) – musician and producer (Polara, Flowers Studio)
 Corey Adam – stand-up comedian
 Amy Adams § – actress
 Anthony Adducci § (1937–2006) – inventor of the worlds first lithium-battery-powered pacemaker
 Peter Agre (born 1949) – co-recipient, 2003 Nobel Prize in Chemistry (shared with Roderick MacKinnon)
 Faysal Ahmed (born 1985) – actor
 Walden L. Ainsworth (1886–1960) – admiral, U.S. Navy
 Eddie Albert § (1906–2005) – actor, gardener and humanitarian activist
 Frank Albertson (1909–1964) – actor
 Grady Alderman § (1938–2018) – Minnesota Vikings football player
 Cole Aldrich (born 1988) – Minnesota Timberwolves basketball player
 Cyrus Aldrich § (1808–1871) – member of U.S. Congress
 John G. Alexander § (1893–1971) – member of U.S. Congress
 Brother Ali (Ali Newman) § (born 1977) – hip-hop artist
 Beau Allen – NFL nose tackle
 Bob Allison § (1934–1995) – Minnesota Twins baseball player
Kyle Altman (born 1986) - soccer player
 Luis Walter Alvarez § (1911–1988) – experimental physicist, Nobel Prize in Physics, 1968
 Janis Amatuzio (born 1950) – American forensic pathologist
 A. A. Ames § (1842–1911) – politician 
 Elmer L. Andersen § (1909–2004) – 30th Governor of Minnesota, businessman, philanthropist
 Herman Carl Andersen § (1897–1978) – member of U.S. Congress
 Alan Anderson (born 1982) – basketball player
 Barry Anderson (born 1954) – judge
 Brad Anderson (born 1969) – professional wrestler
 Clyde Elmer Anderson (1912–1998) – 28th Governor of Minnesota; 30th and 33rd Lieutenant Governor of Minnesota
 Dan Anderson (1920–2003) – psychologist
 Eugenie Anderson (1909–1997) – U.S. Ambassador to Denmark and Bulgaria; first woman appointed U.S. ambassador
 Gary Anderson § (born 1959) – Minnesota Vikings football player
 Gene Anderson (1933–1991) – professional wrestler
 Larry Anderson (born 1952) – actor
 Liz Anderson (1927–2011) – songwriter
 Loni Anderson (born 1945) – actress (WKRP in Cincinnati), former wife of Burt Reynolds
 Louie Anderson (1953-2022) – comedian, television personality (Life with Louie, Family Feud)
 Marc Anderson – percussionist
 Nick Anderson (born 1990) – relief pitcher for the Tampa Bay Rays
 Ole Anderson (born 1942) – professional wrestler
 Patricia Anderson (born 1966) – politician, business owner, 17th state auditor
 Paul Anderson (born 1943) – judge
 Richard Dean Anderson (born 1950) – television actor (MacGyver, Stargate SG-1)
 Russell A. Anderson (1942–2020) – judge
 Scott D. Anderson (1965–1999) – author, engineer, military aviator, Cirrus Airframe Parachute System test pilot
 Sydney Anderson (1881–1948) – member of U.S. Congress
 Wendell Anderson (1933–2016) – 33rd Governor of Minnesota; U.S. Senator
 August H. Andresen § (1890–1958) – member of U.S. Congress
 Christopher Columbus Andrews § (1829–1922) – soldier, diplomat, and author
 LaVerne Andrews (1911–1967) – contralto singer of 1940s sister act The Andrews Sisters
 Maxene Andrews (1916–1995) – soprano singer of The Andrews Sisters
 Patty Andrews (1918–2013) – lead singer of The Andrews Sisters
 Kofi Annan § (1938–2018) – 7th Secretary-General of the United Nations
 Henry M. Arens § (1873–1963) – member of U.S. Congress; 26th Lieutenant Governor of Minnesota
 Richard Arlen (1899–1976) – actor
 Thomas H. Armstrong § (1826–1891) – banker, lawyer, legislator, 5th Lieutenant Governor of Minnesota
 Dave Arneson (1955–2009) – game designer, co-creator of D&D, creator of the first fantasy RPG world (Blackmoor)
 James Arness (1923–2011) – actor (Gunsmoke)
 Dorothy Arnold (Olson) (1917–1984) – film actress, first wife of baseball star Joe DiMaggio
 Jeanne Arth (born 1935) – tennis player
 Antoine Auguelle § – explorer
 Horace Austin § (1831–1905) – 6th Governor of Minnesota
 Roger Awsumb § (1928–2002) – children's television host of Lunch With Casey
 Hy Averback (1920–1997) – director, producer, actor, and production manager
 John T. Averill § (1825–1889) – member of U.S. Congress
 Lew Ayres (1908–1996) – actor

B

 Tim M. Babcock (1919–2015) – politician
 Michele Bachmann § (born 1956) – politician
 David Backes (born 1984) – hockey player
 Tim Bagley (born 1957) – character actor, Strip Mall, Will & Grace
 Bill Baker (born 1956) – hockey player
 Melvin Baldwin § (1838–1901) – member of U.S. Congress
 Joseph H. Ball (1905–1993) – U.S. Senator
 Keith Ballard (born 1982) – hockey player for the Vancouver Canucks
 Maria Bamford (born 1970) – comedian and actress
 Ann Bancroft (born 1955) – polar explorer, first female to reach both the North and South Poles
 Dominique Barber (born 1986) – Houston Texans football player
 Marion Barber III (1983–2022) – Dallas Cowboys football player
 Robert Baril – stand-up comedian
 Dean Barkley (born 1950) – U.S. Senator
 Lynsey Bartilson (born 1983) – actress
 Alphonso Barto – 7th Lieutenant Governor of Minnesota
 Carol Bartz (born 1948) – president and chief executive officer of Yahoo!
 Earl Battey § (1935–2003) – Minnesota Twins baseball player
 Elgin Baylor § (1934–2021) – basketball player
 Charles Baxter (born 1947) – author
 John C. Beale (born 1948) – EPA consultant, convicted felon
 Dick Beardsley (born 1956) – former world-class marathoner, motivational speaker
 Tracy Beckman (born 1945) – government official, politician, business owner and manager
 James Bede § (1856–1942) – member of U.S. Congress
 Nicholas Joseph Begich (1932–1972) – member of U.S. Congress
 James Ford Bell § (1879–1961) – business leader, philanthropist, founder of General Mills
 Troy Bell (born 1980) – basketball player
 Clyde Bellecourt (1936–2022) – Native American civil rights organizer
 Nick Bellore (born 1989) – Seattle Seahawks football player
 Sharon Sayles Belton (born 1951) – first African-American mayor of Minneapolis
 Charles "Chief" Bender (1884–1954) – Baseball Hall of Fame pitcher
 Dorothy Benham (born 1955) – Miss America 1977
 Paris Bennett § (born 1988) – singer
 Tony Benshoof (born 1975) – luger, Olympian
 Elmer Austin Benson (1895–1985) – 24th Governor of Minnesota; U.S. Senator
 Joanne Benson (born 1943) – 44th Lieutenant Governor of Minnesota
 William Benton (1900–1973) – U.S. Senator
 Juan Berenguer § (born 1954) – Minnesota Twins baseball player
 Patty Berg (1918–2006) – golfer, founding member of the LPGA
 Robert Bergland (1928–2018) – U.S. Secretary of Agriculture; member of U.S. Congress
 Tim Bergland (born 1965) – hockey-player
 Nate Berkus (born 1971) – interior designer, author and television personality
 Jason Behr (born 1973) – actor
 John Bernard § (1893–1983) – member of U.S. Congress
 Philip Berrigan (1923–2002) – peace activist, Christian anarchist, and Roman Catholic priest
 Bill Berry (born 1958) – R.E.M. drummer
 Jessica Biel (born 1982) – actress (7th Heaven), married to Justin Timberlake
 Bernie Bierman § (1894–1977) – college football coach
 Big Eagle (c. 1827–1906) – leader of a band of Mdewakanton Sioux Indians
 John Binkowski (born 1979) – politician
 Matt Birk (born 1976) – Baltimore Ravens football player
 Andy Bisek (born 1986) – Olympic Greco-Roman wrestler, two-time world bronze medalist
 Harry Blackmun § (1908–1999) – Associate Justice of the Supreme Court of the United States
 Matt Blair § (1950–2020) – Minnesota Vikings football player
 Jason Blake (born 1973) – hockey player for the Anaheim Ducks
 John Blatnik (1911–1991) – member of the U.S. Congress
 Jerome Blatz – politician
 Kathleen A. Blatz (born 1954) – judge and politician
 Theodore C. Blegen (1891–1969) – historian and author
 Floyd E. Bloom (born 1936) – medical researcher specializing in chemical neuroanatomy
 Josh Blue § (born 1978) – comedian
 Carol Bly (1930–2007) – short-story writer
 Mary Bly (born 1962) – novelist and professor 
 Robert Bly (born 1926) – writer
 Bert Blyleven § (born 1951) – Minnesota Twins baseball player
 Eduard Bøckmann (1849–1927) – ophthalmologist, physician and inventor
 Haldor Boen § (1846–1936) – member of U.S. Congress
 Roman Bohnen (1901–1949) – actor
 Greg Boll (born 1960) – politician, activist
 Brian Bonin (born 1973) – hockey player
 Jeremy Borash (born 1977) – wrestling announcer
 Madeleine Bordallo (born 1933) – politician
 Lorraine Borg (1923–2006) – All-American Girls Professional Baseball League player
 Norman Borlaug § (1914–2009) – agricultural scientist; recipient, 1970 Nobel Peace Prize
 Rudy Boschwitz § (born 1930) – U.S. Senator
 Lyman Bostock § (1950–1978) – baseball player
 Todd Bouman (born 1972) – quarterback for the Jacksonville Jaguars
 Kevin Bowe (born 1961) – songwriter, record producer and musician
 Lloyd Wheaton Bowers § (1859–1910) – Solicitor General
 Gregory A. Boyd (born 1957) – pastor, theologian, author
 Joe Brinkman (born 1944) – umpire
 Ivar Brogger (born 1947) – actor, The Bold and the Beautiful and Invasion
 Herb Brooks (1937–2003) – 1980 Olympics ice hockey coach, Minnesota Golden Gophers coach, Minnesota North Stars coach
 Neal Broten (born 1959) – Minnesota North Stars ice-hockey player
 Jim Brower (born 1972) – baseball player
 Aaron Brown (born 1948) – broadcast journalist
 Bill Brown § (1938–2018) – Minnesota Vikings football player
 Brianna Brown (born 1979) – actress
 Joey Browner § (born 1960) – football player
 Brownmark (Brown Mark or Mark Brown) (born 1962) – musician and producer
 Bob Bruer § (born 1953) – football player and coach
 Tom Brunansky § (born 1960) – Minnesota Twins baseball player
 Bobby Bryant § (born 1944) – Minnesota Vikings football player
 Rich T. Buckler § (1865–1950) – member of U.S. Congress
 Clarence Buckman § (1851–1917) – member of U.S. Congress
 Warren E. Burger (1907–1995) – Chief Justice of the United States
 Michael C. Burgess (born 1950) – physician and politician
 Tom Burgmeier (born 1943) – baseball player
 Joseph A. A. Burnquist § (1879–1961) – 19th Governor of Minnesota; 20th Lieutenant Governor of Minnesota
 Jerry Burns (1927–2021) – Minnesota Vikings football coach
 Tom Burnett (1963–2001) – passenger on United Airlines Flight 93
 Pierce Butler (1866–1939) – Associate Justice of the Supreme Court of the United States
 Dominique Byrd (born 1984) – football player for the Arizona Cardinals
 Thomas R. Byrne – politician

C

 
 Melvin Calvin (1911–1997) – recipient, 1961 Nobel Prize in Chemistry
 Karlyn Kohrs Campbell (born 1937) – academic
 Gino Cappelletti (born 1934) – former collegiate, AFL and NFL wide receiver
 Rod Carew § (born 1945) – Minnesota Twins baseball player
 Ron Carey – politician
 Arne Carlson § (born 1934) – 37th Governor of Minnesota
 Bruce A. Carlson (born 1971) – Commander, Air Force Materiel Command
 Curt Carlson (1914–1999) – businessperson (Carlson Companies, Radisson Hotels)
 Gretchen Carlson – beauty queen, anchor
 John Carlson (born 1984) – tight end for the Arizona Cardinals
 Kelly Carlson (born 1976) – actor
 Kyle and Lane Carlson (born 1978) – models
 Richard Carlson (1912–1977) – actor
 Herb Carneal (1923–2007) – Minnesota Twins baseball announcer
 David Carr (1956–2015) – journalist for The New York Times
 William Leighton Carss § (1865–1931) – member of U.S. Congress
 Anthony Carter § (born 1975) – Minnesota Timberwolves basketball player
 Kiki Carter (Kimberli Wilson) § (born 1957) – environmental activist, organizer, musician, songwriter, and columnist
 Ryan Carter (born 1983) – hockey player for the New Jersey Devils
 Jonathan Carver § (1710–1780) – explorer
 Bob Casey (1925–2004) – Minnesota Twins public-address announcer
 Patrick Casey (born 1978) – writer and actor
 Dave Casper (born 1951) – Hall of Fame NFL offensive lineman and tight end, primarily with the Oakland Raiders
 James Castle § (1836–1903) – member of U.S. Congress
 Tracy Caulkins (born 1963) – swimmer
 James M. Cavanaugh § (1823–1879) – member of U.S. Congress
 Chelsea Charms (born 1976) – model
 Derek Chauvin (born 1976) – former police officer, murderer of George Floyd
 Sam Childers § (born 1962) – former gang biker, founder of Angels of East Africa located in Sudan
 Leeann Chin – founder of the Leeann Chin Chinese restaurant chain
 Tom Chorske (born 1966) – hockey player
 Chief Chouneau (William Cadreau) (1888–1946) – baseball player
 Victor Christgau (1894–1991) – member of U.S. Congress
 Theodore Christianson (1883–1948) – 21st Governor of Minnesota; member of U.S. Congress
 Charles A. Christopherson (1871–1951) – politician
 Nick Ciola (Dominic Ciola or Caesar) – musician
 Moses E. Clapp (1851–1929) – U.S. Senator
 Frank Clague § (1865–1952) – member of U.S. Congress
 Harlan Cleveland (1918–2008) – Club of Rome member, founding dean for the H. H. Humphrey Institute, politician
 Elizabeth Close (1912–2011) – pioneering female architect in Minneapolis
 David Marston Clough § (1846–1924) – 13th Governor of Minnesota; 12th Lieutenant Governor of Minnesota
 Ben Clymer (born 1978) – hockey player
 Cobi (born 1986) – musician
 Eddie Cochran (1938–1960) – musician
 Diablo Cody § (born 1978) – screenwriter
 Ethan Coen (born 1957) – screenwriter, director, producer
 Joel Coen (born 1954) – screenwriter, director, producer
 William Colby (1920–1996) – director of the CIA
 Chris Coleman (born 1961) – politician
 Nick Coleman (1950–2018) – columnist
 Nick Coleman (1925–1981) – politician
 Norm Coleman § (born 1949) – U.S. Senator, Mayor of Saint Paul
 Louis L. Collins – 23rd Lieutenant Governor of Minnesota
 Mo Collins (born 1965) – comedic actor
 William J. Colvill § (1830–1905) – Colonel of the 1st Minnesota Infantry at the battle of Gettysburg, 3rd Minnesota Attorney General
 Tom Compton (born 1989) – Atlanta Falcons offensive tackle
 Ada Comstock (1876–1973) – educator and President of Radcliffe College
 Solomon Comstock § (1842–1933) – member of the U.S. Congress
 Chester Adgate Congdon § (1853–1916) – lawyer and capitalist
 George Contant (1864 – date of death unknown) – train robber; later lectured against crime
 Rachael Leigh Cook (born 1979) – actor, model
 Roger Cooper (born 1944) – teacher, politician
 Marisa Coughlan (born 1974) – model and actor
 Carter Coughlin – football player
 Gratia Countryman (1866–1953) – influential librarian
 Christopher Cox (born 1952) – chairman, U.S. Securities and Exchange Commission; U.S. representative
 Fred Cox § (1938–2019) – Minnesota Vikings football player, inventor of Nerf football
 Brian Coyle (1944–1991) – openly gay politician
 Christopher J. Cramer – University of Minnesota chemistry professor and vice president for research
 Seymour Cray § (1925–1996) – founder Cray Research, supercomputer architect, inventor
 Joseph Crétin § (1799–1857) – first Roman Catholic bishop of Saint Paul
 Ward Cuff (1914–2002) – NFL running back and placekicker
 Daunte Culpepper § (born 1977) – former Minnesota Vikings football player
 Randall Cunningham § (born 1963) – former Minnesota Vikings football player
 Robert E. Cushman Jr. (1914–1985) – Commandant of the Marine Corps

D

 Arlene Dahl (1925-2021) – actress
 Nicole, Erica and Jaclyn Dahm (born 1977) – models
 Craig Dahl (born 1985) – New York Giants football player
 Cathee Dahmen (1945–1997) – supermodel in the 1960s and 1970s
 Shawn Daivari (born 1984) – professional wrestler
 Ian Anthony Dale (born 1978) – actor
 Sean Daley (born 1972) – hip-hop artist
 Teresa Daly (born 1956) – politician
Chad Daniels (born 1975) – comedian
 Billy Dankert – singer-songwriter, drummer
 Barry Darsow (born 1959) – professional wrestler
 Charles Russell Davis § (1849–1930) – member of U.S. Congress
 Cushman Davis (1838–1900) – 7th Governor of Minnesota; U.S. Senator
 Ike Davis (born 1987) – first baseman for the Oakland A's
 Stuart Davis § (born 1971) – musician and songwriter
 Frank A. Day – 13th Lieutenant Governor of Minnesota
 Morris Day (born 1957) – musician and composer
 Vox Day § (born 1968) – publisher, writer, musician and video game designer
 George Dayton (1857–1938) – banker, businessperson
 Mark Dayton (born 1947) – former U.S. Senator, 40th Governor of Minnesota
 Julia Dean (1878–1952) – actress
 Eric Decker (born 1987) – football player
 Gary DeCramer (1944–2012) – politician, educator
 Midge Decter (born 1927) – neoconservative journalist
 Jake Deitchler (born 1989) – Olympic Greco-Roman wrestler
 Marguerite De La Motte (1902–1950) – silent film actress
 William Demarest (1892–1983) – film and television actor
 Dr. Demento (born 1941) – radio personality (aka Barret Eugene Hansen)
 Carol Dempster (1901–1991) – actor
 Tony Denman (born 1979) – actor
 Jessica Dereschuk (born 1982) – 2004 Miss Minnesota
 Edward Devitt (1911–1992) – member of U.S. Congress
 Kate DiCamillo (born 1964) – children's author
 Dez Dickerson (born 1955) – guitarist and singer
 Gordon R. Dickson (1923–2001) – author
Jessie Diggins (born 1991) – Olympian, and first American Women to win the cross-country skiing World Cup.
 Alan Dinehart (1889–1944) – actor
 Richard Dix (1893–1949) – actor
 Gil Dobie (1878–1948) – college football coach
 Farrell Dobbs (1907–1983) – Trotskyist politician, trade unionist
 Tod Dockstader (1932–2015) – composer of electronic music
 Pete Docter (born 1968) – director, writer, animator, Up, WALL-E, Monsters, Inc.
 William Dodd – historian, American ambassador to Nazi Germany
 Chris Doleman (1961–2020) – Minnesota Vikings football player
 Ignatius L. Donnelly (1831–1901) – member of U.S. Congress, 2nd Lieutenant Governor of Minnesota, author
 Frank Doran – politician
 Kelly Doran (born 1957) – businessperson
 Michael Doran § (1827–1915) – politician
 Marjory Stoneman Douglas (1890–1998) – journalist, writer, feminist, and environmentalist
 William O. Douglas (1898–1980) – Associate Justice of the Supreme Court of the United States
 Jeffrey Douma – choir director
 Julia Duffy (born 1951) – comedic actor
 John Lewis Dyer (1812–1901) – pioneering Methodist circuit rider; left Minnesota in 1861 for Colorado
 Daniel Greysolon, Sieur du Lhut § (1639–1710) – French explorer
 Ryan Dungey (born 1989) – supercross and motocross racer
 Mark H. Dunnell § (1823–1904) – member of the U.S. Congress
 David Durenberger (born 1934) – U.S. Senator
 Richard Dworsky (born 1953) – pianist and composer
 Sally Dworsky – singer-songwriter
 Bob Dylan (born 1941) – singer-songwriter, musician, poet
 Joanell Dyrstad (born 1942) – 43rd Lieutenant Governor of Minnesota

E

 Patrick Eaves § (born 1984) – professional hockey player
 Charles Eastman § (1858–1939) – Dakota writer, doctor, lobbyist, co-founder of Boy Scouts of America
 Adolph Olson Eberhart § (1870–1944) – 17th Governor of Minnesota; 17th Lieutenant Governor of Minnesota
 Richard Eberhart (1904–2005) – poet
 Tony Eckstein (1923–2009) – politician, veterinarian, veteran
 Frank Eddy (1856–1929) – member of U.S. Congress
 Linda Eder § (born 1961) – Broadway star and recording artist
 Alonzo J. Edgerton § (1827–1896) – U.S. Senator
 Jim Eisenreich (born 1959) – Minnesota Twins player
 Christian Elder (born 1968) – stock-car driver
 Kimberly Elise (born 1967) – actor
 David Ellefson (born 1964) – musician
 Paul Ellering (born 1953) – professional wrestler
 Carl Eller § (born 1942) – Minnesota Vikings football player
 John F. Elliott (1920–1991) – professor of metallurgy
 Keith Maurice Ellison § (born 1963) – politician
 Franklin Ellsworth (1879–1942) – member of U.S. Congress
 Gil Elvgren (1914–1980) – American pin-up artist
 LaFayette Emmett – politician
 Jonette Engan (born 1951) – politician, activist
 Siri Engberg – curator of visual arts, Walker Art Center
 Ralph Engelstad (1930–2002) – businessperson
 Leif Enger – author
 Elmer William Engstrom (1901–1984) – engineer
 Fred Enke (1897–1985) – college basketball coach
 Eric Enstrom – photographer
 Matt Entenza (born 1960) – politician, former gubernatorial candidate
 Arlen Erdahl (born 1931) – member of the U.S. Congress
 Louise Erdrich (born 1954) – novelist, poet, children's author
 Bryan Erickson (born 1960) – hockey player
 Ethan Erickson (born 1973) – actor, Fashion House
 Scott Erickson (born 1968) – Minnesota Twins baseball player
 Wendell Erickson (1925–2018) – politician, educator, veteran
 Mike Erlandson – politician, corporate executive
 Gilbert Esau (1919–2012) – politician, veteran
 Helga Estby (1860–1942) – noted for her walk across the United States during 1896
 John O. Evjen (1874–1942) – author, church historian and professor of theology
 Douglas Ewart § (born 1946) – instrument builder and musician
 Eyedea (Mike Averill or Oliver Hart) (1982–2010) – underground rapper

F

 Cliff Fagan (1911–1995) – high school basketball referee
 Mike Farrell (born 1939) – actor (M*A*S*H)
 Mike Farrell (born 1978) – hockey player
 Ciatrick Fason § (born 1982) – Minnesota Vikings football player
 Chris Faust § (born 1955) – photographer
 Tammy Faye Messner (1942–2007) – televangelist, singer
 George William Featherstonhaugh § (1780–1866) – explorer
 Jay Feely (born 1976) – placekicker for the New York Jets
 Trevor Fehrman (born 1981) – actor
 Jim Finks § (1927–1994) – Minnesota Vikings and Chicago Bears executive
 David Fischer (born 1988) – hockey player
 Mardy Fish (born 1981) – tennis player
 F. Scott Fitzgerald (1896–1940) – novelist, short story writer
 Frances Scott Fitzgerald (1921–1986) – writer, journalist
 Larry Fitzgerald (born 1983) – football player
 Marcus Fitzgerald (born 1985) – football player
 David Flair (born 1979) – professional wrestler
 Ric Flair § (born 1949) – professional wrestler
 Richard E. Fleming (1917–1942) – sailor
 Loren Fletcher § (1833–1919) – member of U.S. Congress
 George Floyd (1973–2020) – murder victim
 Michael Floyd (born 1989) – football player
 Patrick Flueger (born 1983) – actor, The 4400
 Thomas Fluharty – illustrator
 Harry Flynn § (1933–2019) – Roman Catholic archbishop
 Vince Flynn – author
 John R. Foley (1917–2001) – politician
 Steve Foley (1959–2008) – drummer, member of The Replacements
 Henry Fonda § – actor, attended the University of Minnesota; born in Nebraska
 John M. Ford § (1957–2006) – science-fiction author and poet
 Al Franken § (born 1951) – political humorist, author, radio commentator, U.S. Senator
 Thomas Frankson (1869–1939) – lawyer, real estate developer, politician; 22nd Lieutenant Governor of Minnesota
 Donald M. Fraser (1924–2019) – mayor of Minneapolis, member of U.S. Congress
 James Earle Fraser (1876–1953) – sculptor
 Jeff Frazee (born 1987) – hockey player
 David Frederickson (born 1944) – politician, farmer, former president of National Farmers Union
 Dennis Frederickson (born 1939) – politician, farmer, veteran
 Orville Freeman (1918–2003) – 29th Governor of Minnesota, U.S. Secretary of Agriculture
 Frederick William Freking (1911–1998) – Roman Catholic Bishop
 Bill Frenzel (1928–2014) – member of U.S. Congress
 Thomas Friedman (born 1953) – journalist, columnist, author
 Lindsay Frost (born 1962) – actor
 Daniel Fry (1908–1992) – alien-spaceship passenger
 Aurilla Furber (1847–1898) – poet, writer
 Allen J. Furlow (1890–1954) – member of U.S. Congress

G

 Chad Gable (born 1986) – professional wrestler and former amateur wrestler; competed at 2012 Summer Olympics in Greco-Roman wrestling
 Wanda Gág (1893–1946) – author, illustrator
 John Gagliardi § (1926–2018) – St. John's College football coach
 Greg Gagne § (born 1961) – baseball player
 Greg Gagne (born 1948) – professional wrestler
 Verne Gagne (1923–2015) – former professional wrestler and amateur wrestler, founder of American Wrestling Association, U.S. alternate at 1948  Olympics in freestyle wrestling
 Daniele Gaither (born 1972) – comic actor
 Thomas J. Galbraith – politician
 Richard Pillsbury Gale (1900–1973) – member of U.S. Congress
 William Gallagher (1875–1946) – member of U.S. Congress
 Jane Gallop (born 1952) – professor, feminist
 Chick Gandil (1887–1970) – baseball player
 Roy Alexander Gano (1902–1971) – Vice Admiral, U.S. Navy
 Ron Gardenhire § (born 1957) – manager of the Minnesota Twins
 Judy Garland (1922–1969) – singer, actor
 Lorraine Garland – folk singer and fiddler
 Edward R. Garvey § – activist, lawyer, and politician
 Mike Garvey (born 1962) – stock-car driver
 Charles Gilbert Gates – owned first home air conditioner in the United States in 1914
 Larry Gates (1915–1996) – actor
 Herbjørn Gausta (1854–1924) – landscape artist
 Ron "Boogiemonster" Gerber (born 1968) – disc jockey, pop music historian, and engineer
 J. Paul Getty (1892–1976) – entrepreneur, philanthropist, founder of Getty Oil Company
 John L. Gibbs – 14th Lieutenant Governor of Minnesota
 Tom Gibis (born 1965) – voice actor
 Cass Gilbert § (1859–1934) – architect
 Tom Gilbert – hockey player
 Stan Gilbertson (born 1944) – hockey player
 John Gilfillan § (1835–1924) – member of U.S. Congress
 Terry Gilliam (born 1940) – actor (Monty Python), writer, director
 Sid Gillman (1911–2003) – American football coach
 Charles A. Gilman – 9th Lieutenant Governor of Minnesota
 Robert R. Gilruth (1913–2000) – aviation and space pioneer
 Dan Gladden (born 1957) – Minnesota Twins baseball player
 Billy Glaze (1944–2015) – serial killer
 Arne Glimcher (born 1938) – art dealer, founder of Pace Gallery, film producer and director
 Tony Glover (1939–2019) – musician, music critic
 James B. Goetz § (1936–2019) – radio executive and the 38th Lieutenant Governor of Minnesota
 William H. Goetzmann § (1930–2010) – historian
 Adam Goldberg (born 1980) – NFL tackle/guard
 Godfrey G. Goodwin (1873–1933) – member of U.S. Congress
 Genevieve Gorder (born 1974) – designer, television personality (Trading Spaces)
 Samuel Y. Gordon – 19th Lieutenant Governor of Minnesota
 Willis Arnold Gorman § (1816–1876) – lawyer, soldier, politician
 Irving I. Gottesman § (1930–2016) – behavior geneticist, psychologist
 Billy Graham § (1918–2018) – evangelist, former president of Northwestern College
 Moonlight Graham § (1876–1965) – doctor, baseball player
 Rod Grams (1948–2013) – U.S. Senator; member of U.S. Congress
 Mary GrandPré – illustrator (Harry Potter books)
 Bud Grant § (born 1927) – former Minnesota Vikings football coach
 Jim "Mudcat" Grant § (1935–2021) – Minnesota Twins baseball player
 Peter Graves (Peter Aurness) (1926–2010) – actor (Mission: Impossible television series, Airplane!, 7th Heaven)
 Dennis Green (1949–2016) – Minnesota Vikings football coach
 Lauren Green (born 1958) – beauty queen, anchor
 Steven Greenberg (born 1950) – musician ("Funkytown"), record producer
 Robert Grenier (born 1941) – poet
 Ingebrikt Grose (1862–1939) – founding president of Concordia College
 Joan Growe (born 1935) – former Minnesota Secretary of State
 Gabriele Grunewald (1986–2019) – middle-distance runner
 Ann Morgan Guilbert (1928–2016) – actress, The Dick Van Dyke Show, The Nanny
 Bill Gullickson (born 1959) – baseball player
 Gil Gutknecht § (born 1951) – former member of U.S. Congress
 Joe Guyon (1892–1971) – Hall of Fame NFL player
 Cristian Guzmán § (born 1978) – Minnesota Twins baseball player

H

 Tom Hagedorn (born 1943) – member of the U.S. Congress
 Ra'Shede Hageman § (born 1990) – football player
 Gulbrand Hagen (1864–1919) – newspaper editor and publisher
 Harold Hagen (1901–1957) – member of U.S. Congress
 Molly Hagan (born 1961) – actress
 Camilla Hall (1945–1974) – artist, college trained member of the Symbionese Liberation Army
 Darwin Hall § (1844–1919) – member of U.S. Congress
 Osee M. Hall § (1847–1914) – member of U.S. Congress
 Philo Hall (1865–1938) – politician
 Walter Halloran (1921–2005) – priest, chaplain
 Kittel Halvorson § (1846–1936) – member of U.S. Congress
 C. J. Ham (born 1993) – fullback for the Minnesota Vikings
 Trina Hamlin – singer-songwriter
 Winfield Scott Hammond § (1863–1915) – 18th Governor of Minnesota; member of U.S. Congress
 Brad Hand (born 1990) – pitcher for the Cleveland Indians
 Greg Handevidt § (born 1965) – musician, attorney
 Alan Hangsleben (born 1953) – hockey player
 Dick Hanley (1894–1970) – football player and head coach
 Jack Hannahan (born 1980) – third baseman for the Cleveland Indians
 Ben Hanowski (born 1990) – professional hockey player
 Courtney Hansen (born 1975) – television host and personality, syndicated columnist, author, and actress
 Duane Hanson (1925–1996) – post-modern sculptor
 Holly Henry (born 1994) – The Voice contestant and musician
 Jeff Hanson § (1978–2009) – singer-songwriter, guitarist, and multi-instrumentalist
 Poppy Harlow (born 1982) – news anchor, reporter and journalist for Forbes.com and CNN
 Brian Harper § (born 1959) – baseball player
 Har Mar Superstar (Sean Tillmann) (born 1978) – entertainer
 Tim Harmston § – stand-up comedian
 Donald Harris (1931–2016) – composer and music teacher
 Irving Harris (1910–2004) – businessperson
 William H. Harries § (1843–1921) – member of U.S. Congress
 Napoleon Harris § (born 1979) – football player
 Ryan Harris (born 1985) – football player
 Samantha Harris (born 1973) – television hostess, Dancing with the Stars, Entertainment Tonight
 Ellen Hart § (born 1949) – mystery novelist
 Grant Hart (1961–2017) – musician
 Brynn Hartman (Vicki Omdahl) (1958–1998) – actor
 Josh Hartnett (born 1978) – actor
 Sid Hartman (1920–2020) – sports writer
 Jon Hassler (1933–2008) – author
 Mike Hatch (born 1948) – attorney general
 Brenton G. Hayden – entrepreneur
 Bernt B. Haugan (1862–1931) – minister, politician, and temperance leader
 Randolph E. Haugan (1902–1985) – editor, author and publisher
 Louis J. Hauge Jr. (1924–1945) – sailor
 Marty Haugen (born 1950) – composer
Matthew Hauri (born 1996) – musician
 Pete Hautman § (born 1952) – novelist
 John Hawkes (born 1959) – actor
 Joel Heatwole § (1856–1910) – member of U.S. Congress
 Mitch Hedberg (1968–2005) – absurdist comic
 Bret Hedican (born 1970) – hockey player
 Garrett Hedlund (born 1984) – actor
 Tippi Hedren (born 1930) – actor
 Pudge Heffelfinger (1867–1954) – football player and coach, College Football Hall of Famer
 Michael Hegstrand (1957–2003) – professional wrestler
 Lawrence Heinemi (born 1943) – professional wrestler
 Steve Heitzeg (born 1959) – composer
 Luke Helder (born 1981) – pipe bomber
 E. J. Henderson – football player
 Seantrel Henderson – football player
 Skitch Henderson (Lyle Russell Cedric Henderson) (1918–2005) – pianist, conductor, and composer
 Ben Hendrickson (born 1981) – baseball player
 Darby Hendrickson (born 1972) – hockey player
 Curt Hennig (1958–2003) – professional wrestler
 Joseph Curtis Hennig – professional wrestler
 Larry Hennig – professional wrestler
 Father Hennepin § (1626–1705) – explorer
 Abigail and Brittany Hensel (born 1990) – conjoined twins
 Barton Hepburn (1906–1955) – actor
 Don Herbert (1917–2007) – television host
 Maureen Herman § (born 1966) – musician
 Bryan Hickerson (born 1963) – baseball player
 Wally Hilgenberg – football player
 George Roy Hill (1921–2002) – film director
 James J. Hill § (1838–1916) – railroad tycoon, founder of Great Northern Railway
 Peter Himmelman (born 1960) – songwriter
 John H. Hinderaker (born 1950) – lawyer, blogger
 Larry Hisle § (born 1947) – baseball player
 Charles Hoag § (1808–1888) – scholar
 Tami Hoag – novelist
 Leroy Hoard § (born 1968) – football player
 Jamie Hoffmann – baseball player
 Tobias Hogan – politician
 Joel Hodgson § – comedian and creator of Mystery Science Theater 3000
 Einar Hoidale § – member of U.S. Congress
 Mary Liz Holberg – politician
 William Holcombe § (1804–1870) – first Lieutenant Governor of Minnesota
 Perry Greeley Holden (1865–1959) – professor of agronomy
 Justin Holl (born 1992) – hockey player
 Bill Holm – poet
 Paul Holmgren (born 1955) – hockey player
 James Hong (born 1929) – actor
Quinton Hooker (born 1995) - basketball player in the Israeli Basketball Premier League
 Townsend Hoopes (1922–2004) – soldier
 Eric Hoplin – Deputy Chairman of the Republican Party of Minnesota
 George A. Hormel § (1860–1946) – founder of Hormel Foods
 George "Geordie" Hormel (1928–2006) – musician and recording-studio proprietor
 James Hormel (1933–2021) – philanthropist
 Jay Catherwood Hormel (1892–1954) – businessman
 Aaron Hosack § – football player
 Harold Hotelling (1895–1973) – statistician and economist
 David Housewright (born 1955) – novelist
 Phil Housley (born 1964) – hockey player
 Guy V. Howard (1879–1954) – U.S. Senator
 Kent Hrbek (born 1960) – baseball player
 Lucius Frederick Hubbard § (1836–1913) – 9th Governor of Minnesota
 Don Hultz – football player
 Ramon Humber – football player
 Oliver Humperdink (1949–2011) – wrestling manager
 Hubert Humphrey § (1911–1978) – U.S. Senator, Vice President, and presidential candidate
 Muriel Humphrey § (1912–1998) – U.S. Senator
 Skip Humphrey (born 1942) – Minnesota attorney general
 Kris Humphries (born 1985) – power forward for the New Jersey Nets
 Torii Hunter § (born 1975) – baseball player
 Leonid Hurwicz § (1917–2008) – economist, Nobel laureate
 Lloyd Hustvedt (1922–2002) – professor, Norwegian-American scholar
 Siri Hustvedt (born 1955) – novelist
 Peter Hutchinson (born 1949) – politician and businessperson

I
 Sherwood B. Idso – climatologist, ecologist, soil scientist
 Tim Irwin – football player
 Bill Irwin – professional wrestler
 Scott Irwin (1952–1987) – professional wrestler
 Doran Isackson (1938–1989) – politician, farmer
 Sharon Isbin (born 1956) – classical guitarist
 I Self Devine (born 1972) – musician
 Ishtakhaba – Lakota chief
 Gideon S. Ives – 11th Lieutenant Governor of Minnesota

J

 Carl Richard Jacobi (1908–1997) – author
 Lawrence R. Jacobs (born 1959) – political scientist
 Sada Jacobson (born 1983) – Olympic fencing silver and bronze medalist 
 Sam Jacobson (born 1975) – basketball player
 Jimmy Jam (born 1959) – songwriter, co-founder of Flyte Tyme Productions
 Erasmus James (born 1982) – football player
 Kathleen Hall Jamieson (born 1946) – professor and author
 Harry August Jansen § (1883–1955) – professional magician
 Lee Janzen (born 1964) – golfer
 Kenny Jay (Kenny Benkowski) (born 1937) – professional wrestler
 Sue Jeffers – political activist, radio commentator, businessperson
 Claudia Jennings (Mary Eileen Chesterton) (1949–1979) – model and actor
 Mason Jennings (born 1975) – pop-folk singer-songwriter
 Carl Jensen (1920–1988) – politician, attorney, veteran
 Doron Jensen (born 1957) – businessperson 
 Jim Jensen (1926–1999) – sportswriter
 Richard A. Jensen (1934–2014) – author
 Diane Jergens (1935–2018) – actor
 Herb Joesting (1905–1963) – college and professional American football player
 Bob Johnson (1931–1991) – hockey coach
 Brad Johnson § (born 1968) – football player
 Craig Johnson (born 1972) – hockey player
 Dan Johnson (born 1979) – baseball player
 Dean Johnson (born 1947) – politician
 Dewey Johnson (1899–1941) – member of U.S. Congress
 Earl V. Johnson (1913–1942) – aviator
 Erik Johnson (born 1988) – hockey player
 Gordon Johnson (born 1952) – bass guitarist
 Jellybean Johnson (Garry George Johnson) (born 1956) – songwriter, producer and musician
 Jim Johnson (born 1962) – hockey player
 John Albert Johnson (1861–1909) – 16th Governor of Minnesota
 Josh Johnson (born 1984) – baseball player
 Magnus Johnson § (1871–1936) – U.S. Senator; member of U.S. Congress
 Marcus Johnson (born 1981) – football player
 Mark Johnson (born 1957) – hockey player
 Mark Steven Johnson (born 1964) – director and screenwriter, Ghost Rider, Daredevil
 Marlene Johnson (born 1946) – 42nd Lieutenant Governor of Minnesota
 Paul Johnson (1936–2016) – hockey player
 Reynold B. Johnson (1906–1998) – inventor and computer pioneer
 Ron Johnson – U.S. Senator for Wisconsin
 Scott W. Johnson (born 1940) – lawyer, blogger
 Spencer Johnson – football player
 Tyler Johnson (born 1998) – football player
 Lance Johnstone (born 1973) – football player
 Frederick McKinley Jones (1893–1961) – inventor, cofounder of Thermo King
 Jacques Jones (born 1975) – baseball player
 Ray W. Jones – 16th Lieutenant Governor of Minnesota
 Tyus Jones (born 1996) – NBA basketball player for the Memphis Grizzlies
Tre Jones - NBA basketball player for the San Antonio Spurs
 Bennie Joppru (born 1980) – football player
 Cameron Jordan (born 1989) – football player
 Steve Jordan § (born 1961) – football player
 Carl O. Jorgenson (1881–1951) – politician
 Bradley Joseph (born 1965) – composer, pianist, keyboardist
 Walter Judd § (1898–1994) – member of U.S. Congress
 Jerry Juhl (1938–2005) – television and movie writer, puppeteer
 Dan Jurgens (born 1959) – writer and illustrator

K

 Jim Kaat (born 1938) – baseball player
Timothy M. Kaine (born 1958) – United States Senator from Virginia (2013–), former Governor of Virginia (2006–2010)
 John Anthony Kaiser (1932–2000) – Roman Catholic priest killed in Kenya
 Henry Kalis (1937–2018) – politician, farmer, veteran
 Rick Kamla – NBA TV broadcaster
 Joe Kapp (born 1939) – football player
 Rich Karlis (born 1959) – football player
 Joseph Karth (1922–2005) – member of U.S. Congress
 Vincent Kartheiser (born 1979) – actor
 Terry Katzman (1955–2019) – producer, sound engineer, archivist, record-store owner
 Evan Kaufmann (born 1984) – professional ice hockey player in Germany
 Maude Kegg (Ojibwa name Naawakamigookwe) (1904–1996) – writer, folk artist, and cultural interpreter
 Tim Kehoe (born 1970) – inventor and author
 Garrison Keillor (born 1942) – radio humorist and author (A Prairie Home Companion)
 Alexander M. Keith (1928–2020) – judge, politician; 37th Lieutenant Governor of Minnesota
 James "J.R." Keller (1907–1972) – politician, farmer, contractor
 Melissa Keller (born 1979) – model and actress
 Oscar Keller (1878–1927) – member of U.S. Congress
 Rachel Keller (born 1991) – actress, Fargo
 Wade Keller – columnist
 Devin Kelley – actress, The Chicago Code
 John Edward Kelley § (1853–1941) – South Dakota politician
 Steve Kelley (born 1953) – politician
 Frank Kellogg § (1856–1937) – U.S. Senator, U.S. Secretary of State, Kellogg-Briand Pact
 Randy Kelly (born 1950) – politician
 Tom Kelly (born 1950) – baseball coach
 Linda Kelsey (born 1946) – actor
 Mark Kennedy (born 1957) – former member of U.S. Congress
 Elizabeth Kenny § (1880–1952) – nurse, discovered revolutionary treatment for polio
 George Keogan (1890–1943) – basketball coach
 Ancel Keys (1904–2004) – nutritionist
 Leonard Kibrick (1924–1993) – child actor
 Sidney Kibrick (born 1928) – child actor
 Jefferson P. Kidder § (1815–1883) – lawyer and jurist
 Dana Kiecker (born 1961) – baseball player
 Andrew Kiefer § (1832–1904) – member of U.S. Congress
 Mary Kiffmeyer (born 1946) – Minnesota Secretary of State
 Craig Kilborn (born 1962) – television personality
 John N. Kildahl (1857–1920) – Lutheran church minister, author and educator
 Harmon Killebrew § (1936–2011) – baseball player
 Ward Kimball (1914–2002) – animator, musician
 Charles Kimbrough (born 1936) – actor
 William S. King § (1828–1900) – member of U.S. Congress
 William W. Kingsbury § (1828–1892) – politician
 Sheila Kiscaden – politician
 Jeremy James Kissner (born 1985) – actor
 Norman Kittson § (1814–1888) – businessperson, politician
 Trent Klatt (born 1971) – hockey player
 Kurt Kleinendorst (born 1960) – hockey coach
 Scot Kleinendorst (1960–2019) – hockey player
 Jim Kleinsasser § (born 1977) – football player
 John Kline § (born 1947) – member of U.S. Congress
 Amy Klobuchar (born 1960) – U.S. Senator
 Chuck Klosterman (born 1972) – writer
 Chris Kluwe § (born 1981) – football player
 T. R. Knight (born 1973) – actor
 Chuck Knoblauch § (born 1968) – baseball player
 Chris Knutson – stand-up comedian
 Coya Knutson § (1912–1996) – member of U.S. Congress
 Harold Knutson § (1880–1953) – member of U.S. Congress
 Paul Koering (born 1964) – politician; rare openly gay Republican
 Spider John Koerner (born 1938) – musician
 Nikita Koloff (born 1959) – professional wrestler
 Jerry Koosman (born 1942) – baseball player
 Charlie Korsmo § (born 1978) – actor
 Corey Koskie § (born 1973) – baseball player
 Kristina Koznick – downhill skier, Olympian
 Tommy Kramer § (born 1955) – football player
 Herbert Arthur Krause (1905–1976) – American historian
 Paul Krause § (born 1942) – football player
 Peter Krause (born 1965) – actor
 Richard E. Kraus § (1925–1944) – sailor
 Mitch Krebs – anchor
 Joan B. Kroc (1928–2003) – philanthropist
 Pat Kronebusch (1927–2004) – politician, educator
 Helen Barbara Kruger (1913–2006) – entrepreneur
 Robert T. Kuhn (born 1937) – Lutheran minister
 Bernie Kukar – National Football League referee
 William F. Kunze (1872–1962) – banker, politician
 Tom Kurvers (1962–2021) – hockey player
 Ole J. Kvale § (1869–1929) – member of U.S. Congress
 Paul John Kvale § (1896–1940) – member of U.S. Congress
 Ben Kyle § (born 1981) – musician, songwriter

L

 James D. La Belle (1924–1945) – sailor
 Manuel Lagos (born 1971) – soccer player
 Ann Landers (1918–2002) – columnist for Minneapolis Star Tribune; birth name Eppie Lederer
 Lenny Lane (born 1970) – professional wrestler
 Odin Langen (1913–1976) – member of U.S. Congress
 Jessica Lange (born 1949) – actor
 Jim Lange (1932–2014) – television host
 Jamie Langenbrunner (born 1975) – hockey player
 Josh Langfeld (born 1977) – hockey player
 Katherine Lanpher (born 1959) – radio personality, journalist
 Gene Larkin (born 1962) – baseball player
 Erik Larsen (born 1962) – comic-book writer, artist, and publisher
 Gary Larsen (born 1942) – football player
 Oscar Larson § (1871–1957) – member of U.S. Congress
 Reed Larson (born 1956) – hockey player
 George Latimer § (born 1935) – politician
 Roger Laufenburger (1921–2001) – politician, radio announcer, insurance agent
 Tom Laughlin (1931–2013) – actor
 James Laurinaitis (born 1986) – football player
 Trevor Laws § (born 1985) – football player
 Matt Lawton § (born 1971) – baseball player
 Bernie Leadon (born 1947) – musician
 Carrie Lee – beauty queen
 Carl Lee – football player
 Tammy Lee (born 1971) – businessperson and politician
 Pinky Lee (1907–1993) – actor and star of The Pinky Lee Show
 Sunisa Lee (born 2003) – Olympic gold medalist
 James LeGros (born 1962) – actor
 Tom Lehman (born 1959) – golfer
 John D. LeMay (born 1962) – actor
 Greg LeMond (born 1961) – Tour de France winner
 Brock Lesnar § (born 1977) – professional wrestler, folkstyle wrestler, and UFC fighter
 Meridel Le Sueur § (1900–1996) – writer
 Jon Leuer (born 1989) – basketball player for the Detroit Pistons
 Harold LeVander § (1910–1992) – 32nd Governor of Minnesota
 David Levin – singer-songwriter
 Mark LeVoir (born 1982) – offensive tackle for the New England Patriots
 Len Levy (1921–1999) – American football player and professional wrestler
 Bob Lewis (1924–2006) – businessperson, champion race horse owner
 Sinclair Lewis (1885–1951) – Nobel Prize-winning novelist
 Terry Lewis § (born 1956) – songwriter, co-founder of Flyte Tyme Productions
 Walter Liggett (1886–1935) – journalist, newspaper editor
 C. Walton Lillehei (1918–1999) – doctor who performed first open heart surgery
 John Lind § (1854–1930) – 14th Governor of Minnesota; member of U.S. Congress
 Bruce Lindahl (1919–2014) – Minnesota legislator
 Terrance Lindall (born 1944) – artist
 Mike Lindell (born 1961) – My Pillow inventor and advisor to President Trump
 Charles August Lindbergh, Sr. § (1859–1924) – member of U.S. Congress
 Charles Lindbergh § (1902–1974) – aviator, first non-stop solo flight across the Atlantic Ocean
 Gottfrid Lindsten 29th Lieutenant Governor of Minnesota
 Chris Liwienski – football player
 Charles M. Loring (1833–1922) – Minneapolis businessman, civic leader, "Father of Park System"
 Maud Hart Lovelace (1892–1980) – author
 Kirk Lowdermilk – football player
 Cal Ludeman (born 1951) – politician, state commissioner, farmer
 Ernest Lundeen § (1878–1940) – U.S. Senator; member of U.S. Congress
 Bob Lurtsema – football player
 Bill Luther (born 1945) – member of U.S. Congress
 David Lykken (1928–2006) – behavioral geneticist and Professor Emeritus of Psychology and Psychiatry
 Joseph Lykken (born 1957) – physicist
 Dorothy Lyman (born 1947) – actor, director, and producer
 Kelly Lynch (born 1959) – actor
 Audra Lynn (born 1980) – model and actor
 Jerry Lynn (born 1963) – professional wrestler

M

 Melvin Maas (1898–1964) – member of U.S. Congress
 John L. MacDonald § (1838–1903) – member of U.S. Congress
 Clark MacGregor (1922–2003) – member of U.S. Congress
 Mary Mack § (born 1975) – stand-up comedian
 Catharine MacKinnon (born 1946) – legal scholar
 George MacKinnon (1906–1995) – member of U.S. Congress
 Cornell MacNeil – singer
 Myles Mace (1911–2000) – Harvard Business School professor
 Shane Mack § (born 1963) – baseball player
 John Madden (1936-2021) – football coach and commentator
 Chris Maddock – stand-up comedian 
 Amos Magee (born 1971) - soccer player, coach, and front office
 Clarence R. Magney (1883–1962) – judge
 Warren G. Magnuson (1905–1989) – politician
 Tom Malchow (born 1976) – swimmer
 Mark Mallman (born 1973) – musician
 George Mann (1918–1984) – politician, farmer
 Paul Manship (1885–1966) – sculptor
 John Mariucci (1916–1987) – hockey coach
 Roger Maris (1934–1985) – baseball player
 Sharon Marko – politician
 June Marlowe (1903–1984) – actor
 Kelli Maroney – actress, Ryan's Hope, One Life to Live
 Forrest Mars, Sr. (1904–1999) – CEO, Mars, Inc., creator of M&M's
 Frank Mars (1883–1934) – founder of Mars, Inc., creator of Milky Way candy bar
 E. G. Marshall (1914–1998) – actor
 Fred Marshall (1906–1985) – member of U.S. Congress
 Jim Marshall § (born 1937) – football player
 William Rainey Marshall § (1825–1896) – 5th Governor of Minnesota
 Theodore Marston (1868–1920) – film director and writer
 Billy Martin § (1928–1989) – baseball coach
 Homer Dodge Martin § (1836–1897) – painter
 Paul Martin (born 1981) – hockey player
 James Martinez (born 1958) – Olympic bronze medalist in Greco-Roman wrestling
 John Marty – politician
 Brownie Mary (Mary Jane Rathbun) (1922–1999) – baker
 Bob Mason (born 1961) – hockey player
 Shirley Ardell Mason (1923–1998) – abuse victim
 Tommy Mason (1939–2015) – football player
 Bethanie Mattek-Sands (born 1985) – professional tennis-player
 Mark Mattson (born 1957) – neuroscientist
 Gene Mauch § (1925–2005) – baseball manager
 Joe Mauer (born 1983) – Minnesota Twins baseball player
 John Mayasich (born 1933) – hockey player
 Wendy Maybury – stand-up comedian
 Charles Horace Mayo (1865–1939) – doctor, co-founder of the Mayo Clinic
 William J. Mayo (1861–1939) – doctor, co-founder of the Mayo Clinic
 William Worrall Mayo § (1819–1911) – doctor, head of St. Mary's Hospital
 Joe Mays (born 1975) – baseball player
Ryan McCartan (born 1993) – actor
 Eugene McCarthy (1916–2005) – U.S. Senator; presidential candidate; member of U.S. Congress
 Kevin McCarthy (1914–2010) – actor
 James McCleary § (1853–1924) – member of U.S. Congress
 Fancy Ray McCloney – stand-up comedian
 Betty McCollum (born 1954) – member of U.S. Congress
 Ed McDaniel – football player
 Randall McDaniel (born 1964) – football player
 James E. McDonald (1920–1971) – physicist
 Denis McDonough (born 1969) – White House Chief of Staff
 Heather McElhatton – writer, reporter, and radio host
 Hugh McElhenny § (1928–2022) – football player
 Margaret McFadden (1870–1932) – community leader
 Bobby McFerrin § (born 1950) – jazz singer
 Andrew Ryan McGill § (1840–1905) – 10th Governor of Minnesota
 Kevin McHale (born 1957) – basketball player
 Bethany McLean (born 1971) – author
 John McMartin (1929–2016) – actor
 Samuel J. R. McMillan § (1826–1897) – judge, U.S. Senator
 Audray McMillian – football player
 Lesley J. McNair (1883–1944) – soldier
 Graham McNamee (1888–1942) – broadcaster
 Dugan McNeill – guitarist
 Pamela McNeill – singer-songwriter
 Marcia McNutt – geophysicist, National Academy of Sciences president
 Samuel Medary § (1801–1864) – politician, 3rd Governor of Minnesota Territory
Niko Medved (born 1973) - college basketball coach
 Ralph Meeker (Ralph Rathgeber) (1920–1988) – actor
 Mike Menning (born 1945) – politician, businessman, minister
 William Rush Merriam § (1849–1931) – 11th Governor of Minnesota
 Jeremy Messersmith § – musician
 James Metzen (1943–2016) – politician
 Breckin Meyer (born 1974) – actor
 Joe Micheletti (born 1954) – hockey player
 Doug Mientkiewicz (born 1974) – baseball player
 Boris Mikšić (born 1948) – Croatian-born businessman and politician
 Keith Millard (born 1962) – football player
 Archie H. Miller – 32nd Lieutenant Governor of Minnesota
 Clarence B. Miller (1872–1922) – member of U.S. Congress
 Joey Miller (born 1985) – stock-car driver
 Stephen Miller § (1816–1881) – 4th Governor of Minnesota
 Worm Miller (born 1978) – writer, director, and actor
 Kate Millett (1934–2017) – feminist and writer
 Larry Millett (born 1947) – journalist and author
 Tommy Milton (1893–1962) – race car driver
 Don Mincher (1938–2012) – baseball player
 David Minge (born 1942) – former member of U.S. Congress, state appeals court judge
 William D. Mitchell (1874–1955) – U.S. Attorney General
 Roger Moe (born 1944) – politician
 Don Moen (born 1950) – worship leader and president of Hosanna! Music
 Mother Alfred Moes § (1828–1899) – founder of St. Mary's Hospital
 Paul Molitor (born 1956) – baseball player, manager
 Carol Molnau (born 1949) – 46th Lieutenant Governor of Minnesota
 Dorothy Molter (1907–1986) – entrepreneur
 Eleanor Mondale (1960–2011) – television host, daughter of Walter Mondale
 Joan Mondale § (1930–2014) – second lady of the United States
 Walter Mondale (1928–2021) – Vice President of the United States, U.S. Senator
 Robert Mondavi (1913–2008) – winemaker
 Warren Moon (born 1956) – football player
 Freddy Moore (born 1950) – songwriter
 Mewelde Moore (born 1982) – football player
 Tom Moore (born 1938) – senior offensive assistant for the Indianapolis Colts
 Mike Morin (born 1991) – baseball player
 Jack Morris (born 1955) – baseball player
 Robert P. Morris § (1853–1924) – member of U.S. Congress
 Dorilus Morrison § (1814–1898) – politician
 Greg Mortenson – activist
 Marnie Mosiman – actor, singer
 Randy Moss § (born 1977) – football player
 Mee Moua § (born 1969) – politician
 Bob Mould § (born 1960) – musician
 John Edward Mower § (1815–1879) – businessperson, politician
 Karl Mueller (1963–2005) – musician
 Peter Mueller (born 1988) – hockey player
 Mark Mullaney – football player
 Biggie Munn (1908–1975) – football player and coach
 Adolph Murie (1899–1974) – biologist, author
 Diana E. Murphy (1934–2018) – judge
 Willie Murphy (1943–2019) – musician
 Rick Mystrom – politician

N

 Arthur Naftalin § (1917–2005) – politician
 Ellen Torelle Nagler (1870–1965) – biologist, non-fiction writer
 Bronko Nagurski § (1908–1990) – football player, professional wrestler
 Peter Najarian § (born 1963) – options trader, television personality for CNBC
 Joe Nathan (born 1974) – baseball player
 Noel Neill (1920–2016) – actor
 LeRoy Neiman (1921–2012) – sports artist
 Ancher Nelsen (1904–1992) – 34th Lieutenant Governor of Minnesota; member of U.S. Congress
 Arthur E. Nelson (1892–1955) – U.S. Senator
 Cindy Nelson (born 1955) – alpine skier
 Darrin Nelson (born 1959) – football player
 Ken G. Nelson (born 1936) – former Minnesota state representative
 George Nelson § (born 1950) – astronaut
 Holly Nelson – poet, politician
 Knute Nelson § (1843–1923) – 12th Governor of Minnesota; U.S. Senator; member of U.S. Congress
 Roy Nelson (1905–1956) – cartoonist
 Steve Nelson (born 1951) – football player for the New England Patriots
 Pat Neshek § (born 1980) – relief pitcher for the Minnesota Twins
 Tom Netherton (1947–2018) – singer
 Graig Nettles § (born 1944) – baseball player
 Ernie Nevers (1902–1976) – Hall of Fame football player
 Walter Newton (1880–1941) – member of U.S. Congress
 Joseph Nicollet § (1786–1843) – explorer
 Tom Niedenfuer (born 1959) – baseball player
 Matt Niskanen (born 1986) – hockey player
 Richard Nolan (born 1943) – member of U.S. Congress
 William I. Nolan (1874–1943) – 24th Lieutenant Governor of Minnesota; member of U.S. Congress
 Gena Lee Nolin (born 1971) – actress and model, Baywatch, Sheena
 John Nord (born 1959) – professional wrestler
 Michele Norris – radio journalist
 William Norris § (1911–2006) – CEO Control Data
 Lauris Norstad (1907–1988) – general, commander of NATO forces
 Daniel S. Norton § (1829–1870) – U.S. Senator
 Eunice Norton (1908–2005) – pianist
 Greg Norton (born 1959) – musician, chef
 Scott Norton (born 1961) – professional wrestler
 Frank Nye § (1852–1935) – member of U.S. Congress

O

 Tim O'Brien (born 1946) – author
 Mac O'Grady (born 1951) – golfer
 Joseph P. O'Hara (1895–1975) – member of U.S. Congress
 Michael O'Leary (born 1958) – actor
 Jim Oberstar (1934–2014) – member of U.S. Congress
 Tim Ocel – director
 Willie Offord (born 1978) – football player
 "Mean Gene" Okerlund (1942–2019) – professional wrestling interviewer and announcer
 Kyle Okposo (born 1988) – hockey player
 Tony Oliva § (born 1938) – baseball player
 Alec G. Olson (born 1930) – member of U.S. Congress; 40th Lieutenant Governor of Minnesota
 Earl B. Olson (1915–2006) – founder of the Jennie-O Turkey company
 Floyd B. Olson (1891–1936) – 22nd Governor of Minnesota
 Greg Olson (born 1960) – baseball player
 Howard Olson (1937–1996) – politician, farmer
 John Olson (1906–1981) – politician, farmer
 Katy Olson (1928–2011) – politician, farmer
 Kenneth L. Olson (1945–1968) – Vietnam War veteran
 Mark Olson (1943–2018) – member of the Board of Governors of the U.S. Federal Reserve
 Sigurd Olson (1899–1982) – environmentalist
 Ilhan Omar § – politician
 Norman J. Ornstein – political scientist
 Dave Osborn – football player
 T.J. Oshie § – hockey player
 Laura Osnes (born 1985) – actor, singer
 Peter Ostroushko (1953–2021) – violinist
 Rebecca Otto (born 1963) – politician, 18th state auditor

P

 Alan Page § (born 1945) – football player and Minnesota Supreme Court justice
 John U. D. Page (1903–1950) – soldier
 Doug Pagitt – religion author
 Floyd Palmer (born 1943) – businessperson
 Carl Panzram (1891–1930) – serial killer, author
 George Andreas Papandreou (born 1952) – Greek politician
 Bob Paradise (born 1944) – hockey player
 Zach Parise (born 1984) – hockey player
 Robert Ezra Park § (1864–1944) – urban sociologist
 Bradford Parkinson (born 1935) – father of the Global Positioning System
 Gordon Parks § (1912–2006) – photographer
 Emory Parnell (1892–1979) – actor
 Nancy Parsons (1942–2001) – actor
 Camilo Pascual (born 1934) – baseball player
 Brandon Paulson (born 1973) – Olympic silver medalist in Greco-Roman wrestling
 Gary Paulsen (born 1939) – author
 Jeno Paulucci – founder of Jeno's Frozen Pizza, Chun King Corporation, and Luigino's
 Mary Pawlenty – judge, first lady of the state
 Tim Pawlenty (born 1960) – 39th Governor of Minnesota
 Barbara Payton (1927–1967) – actor
 Pat Peake (born 1973) – hockey player
 Westbrook Pegler (1894–1969) – journalist and writer
 Mary Jo Pehl – actor, broadcaster, and writer
 Tim Penny (born 1951) – member of U.S. Congress
 Glen Perkins (born 1983) – baseball player
 Rudy Perpich (1928–1995) – 34th and 36th Governor of Minnesota; 39th Lieutenant Governor of Minnesota
 Jim Perry § (born 1935) – baseball player
 Melissa Peterman (born 1970) – actor
 Christian T. Petersen – board game designer and founder of Fantasy Flight Games
 Hjalmar Petersen § (1890–1968) – 23rd Governor of Minnesota; 28th Lieutenant Governor of Minnesota
 Aaron Peterson – politician
 Barbara Peterson – Miss USA 1976
 Collin Peterson (born 1944) – member of U.S. Congress
 Darrel Peterson (1939–1994) – politician, farmer
 Paul Peterson (St. Paul) – musician
 Wayne Peterson (1925–2021) – composer, Pulitzer Prize winner
 Jake Petricka (born 1988) – baseball player
 Anna Augusta Von Helmholtz-Phelan – professor, author
 William Wallace Phelps § (1826–1873) – member of U.S. Congress
 Reynold Philipsek (born 1952) – musician
 Arthur Phillips (born 1969) – author
 Don Piccard (1926–2020) – balloonist
 Jean Piccard § (1884–1963) – organic chemist, balloonist
 Jeannette Piccard § (1895–1981) – teacher, balloonist, priest
 Justin Pierre (born 1976) – musician
 Janelle Pierzina (born 1980) – actor, model
 Bernard Pietenpol (1901–1984) – mechanic, aircraft designer
 Zebulon Montgomery Pike § (1779–1813) – explorer
 John S. Pillsbury § (1828–1901) – founder of Pillsbury, 8th Governor of Minnesota
 Chellie Pingree (born 1955) – politician
 Robert M. Pirsig § (1928–2017) – author, philosopher
 William Pittenger § (1885–1951) – member of U.S. Congress
 Mike Ploog (born 1942) – storyboard and comic-book artist
 Henry Stanley Plummer (1874–1937) – physician
 Mortimer Plumtree (born 1969) – former actor and professional wrestling manager
 Shjon Podein (born 1968) – hockey player
 Henry Poehler § (1833–1912) – member of U.S. Congress
 Carl Pohlad § (1915–2009) – billionaire, baseball owner and philanthropist
 Joe Polo (born 1982) – curler and Olympic bronze medalist
 Olivia Poole (1889–1975) – inventor
 P.O.S – rapper
 Vic Power § (1927–2005) – baseball player
 Chris Pratt (born 1979) – actor, Everwood, Parks and Recreation
 Tom Preissing § (born 1978) – hockey player
 Amber Preston § – stand-up comedian
 Jacob Aall Ottesen Preus § (1883–1961) – 20th Governor of Minnesota
 Jacob Aall Ottesen Preus II (1920–1994) – Lutheran minister
 Prince (full name Prince Rogers Nelson) (1958–2016) – singer-songwriter, actor, composer
 Pat Proft (born 1947) – comedy writer and actor
 Joel Przybilla (born 1979) – basketball player
 Kirby Puckett § (1960–2006) – Baseball Hall of Famer
 George Putnam (1914–2008) – television host
 Herbert Putnam § (1861–1955) – Librarian of Congress
 William S. Pye (1880–1959) – Admiral, U.S. Navy

Q
 Becky Quick (born 1972) – co-anchorwoman of CNBC's Squawk Box
 Al Quie (born 1923) – 35th Governor of Minnesota; member of U.S. Congress
 Frank Quilici § (1939–2018) – baseball player
 Robb Quinlan (born 1977) – baseball player

R

 Brian Raabe (born 1967) – baseball player
 Brad Radke (born 1972) – baseball player
 Pedro Ramos (born 1935) – baseball player
 Alexander Ramsey § (1815–1903) – 2nd Governor of Minnesota; U.S. Senator
 Jim Ramstad § (1946–2020) – member of U.S. Congress
 John Randle (born 1967) – football player
 Ralph Rapson § (1914–2008) – architect
 Baron von Raschke § (born 1940) – professional wrestler
 Ahmad Rashad (born 1949) – football player
 Erik Rasmussen (born 1977) – hockey player
 Edwin W. Rawlings (1904–1997) – chief executive officer, General Mills; USAF General (Ret.)
 Dave "Snaker" Ray (1943–2002) – musician
 Jeff Reardon (born 1955) – baseball player
 Harry Reasoner § (1923–1991) – television journalist
 Jake Reed (born 1967) – football player
 Oscar Reed – football player
 Rich Reese (born 1941) – baseball player
 Olli Rehn (born 1962) – European Commissioner for Enlargement and European Neighbourhood Policy
 Ember Reichgott Junge – attorney, radio host, and politician
 Chris Reitsma (born 1977) – baseball player
 Earl Renneke (1928–2021) – politician, farmer
 Rip Repulski (1927–1993) – baseball player
 Michael Restovich (born 1979) – baseball player
 Patrick Reusse – sports writer
 Brad Rheingans (born 1953) – former professional wrestler and amateur wrestler; Greco-Roman wrestler for USA at two Olympic Games
 Albert E. Rice (1845–1921) – banker, newspaperman, legislator, and the 10th Lieutenant Governor of Minnesota
 Edmund Rice § (1819–1889) – member of U.S. Congress
 Henry Mower Rice § (1816–1894) – U.S. Senator
 Todd Richards – head coach of the NHL's Columbus Blue Jackets
 Kaylin Richardson – downhill skier, Olympian, Nor-Am Champion, US National Champion, World Champion
 William B. Richardson – acting Lieutenant Governor of Minnesota (1936–1937)
 Nate Richert (born 1978) – actor
 Carl W. Riddick (1872–1960) – member of U.S. Congress
 Beth Riesgraf (born 1978) – actress
 Martha Ripley § (1843–1912) – physician; founder, Maternity Hospital in Minneapolis
 Mark Ritchie (born 1951) – Minnesota Secretary of State
 Laila Robins (born 1959) – actress
 Jay Robinson (born 1946) – Olympic Greco-Roman wrestler and former University of Minnesota wrestling coach
 Koren Robinson – football player
 Marcus Robinson (born 1975) – football player
 Robyne Robinson – newscaster
 Stacy Robinson – football player
 Svend Robinson (born 1952) – Canadian politician
 Rafael Rodriguez – boxer
 Brian Rogowski (born 1970) – professional wrestler
 Todd Rohloff (born 1974) – hockey player
 Rich Rollins (born 1938) – baseball player
 Karl Rolvaag (1913–1990) – 31st Governor of Minnesota; 36th Lieutenant Governor of Minnesota
 Ole Rolvaag § (1876–1931) – novelist
 Richard Rood (1958–1999) – professional wrestler, best known by his ringname "Ravishing" Rick Rude
 Mike Rosenthal – football player
 Marion Ross (born 1928) – actor
 Coleen Rowley (born 1954) – former FBI agent and whistleblower; candidate for Congress in the 2nd District of Minnesota
 Dwayne Rudd (born 1976) – football player
 Donald Eugene Rudolph, Sr. (c. 1921–2006) – soldier
 Jane Russell (1921–2011) – film actress
 Elmer Ryan (1907–1958) – member of U.S. Congress
 R. T. Rybak (born 1955) – politician, newspaper editor
 Winona Ryder (born 1971) – actor

S

 Dwight M. Sabin § (1843–1902) – U.S. Senator
 Martin Olav Sabo § (1938–2016) – former member of U.S. Congress
 Saint Dog (Steven Thronson) – rapper from Chisholm, Minnesota; member of the hip-hop group Kottonmouth Kings
 Harrison Salisbury (1908–1993) – journalist
 Zak Sally – musician
 Ralph Samuelson (1903–1977) – inventor of water skiing, first water-ski jumper and speed skier
 John B. Sanborn (1826–1904) – Union Army General, state legislator
 John B. Sanborn Jr. (1883–1964) – Eighth Circuit Court of Appeals Judge
 Michael J. Sandel (born 1953) – political philosopher, Harvard professor 
 Charlie Sanders (born 1979) – actor
 Tony Sanneh (born 1971) – soccer player
 Johan Santana (born 1979) – baseball player
 Gary Sargent (born 1954) – hockey player
 Gloria Sawai (Gloria Ruth Ostrem) (1932–2011) – author of fiction
 Thomas D. Schall § (1878–1935) – U.S. Senator; member of U.S. Congress
 Dan Schlissel § (born 1970) – record producer, founder of Stand Up! Records and -ismist Recordings
 Bruce Schneier (born 1963) – founder and chief technology officer, Counterpane Internet Security
 Henry Schoolcraft § (1793–1864) – explorer
 Charles M. Schulz (1922–2000) – cartoonist
 Richard M. Schulze (born 1940) – founder and chairman, Best Buy
 Mae Schunk § (born 1934) – 45th Lieutenant Governor of Minnesota
 Kathryn Leigh Scott (Kathryn Kringstad) (born 1945) – author, actor
 Seann William Scott (born 1976) – actor
 Todd Scott – football player
 Briana Scurry (born 1971) – soccer player
 Richard Warren Sears (1863–1914) – co-founder, Sears, Roebuck and Company
 Mitch Seavey – dog musher
 Jerry Seeman – NFL referee and Director of Officiating
 Robert Seguso (born 1963) – tennis player
 Aaron Sele (born 1970) – baseball player
 Conrad Selvig (1877–1953) – member of U.S. Congress
 Lyle Sendlein (born 1984) – football player
 Joe Senser – football player
 Marty Sertich (born 1982) – hockey player
 Brian Setzer § – musician
 Eric Sevareid § (1912–1992) – television journalist
 Stephen Shadegg (1909–1990) – political consultant in Phoenix, Arizona; born in Minneapolis
 Kyle Shanahan (born 1979) – football coach
 Eddie Sharkey – wrestling coach
 Darren Sharper (born 1975) – football player
 Clark Shaughnessy (1892–1970) – football coach
 Sam Shepard – actor and playwright; lived in Stillwater, Minnesota, with partner Jessica Lange
 Marcus Sherels – football player 
 Sean Sherk (born 1973) – mixed martial artist and former UFC Lightweight Champion
 Charles D. Sherwood – 4th Lieutenant Governor of Minnesota
 James Shields § (1810–1879) – U.S. Senator
 Henrik Shipstead (1881–1960) – U.S. Senator
 Francis Shoemaker (1889–1958) – member of U.S. Congress
 BeBe Shopp (born 1930) – Miss America 1948
 Bob Short (1917–1982) – owner of sports teams and politician
 Henry Hastings Sibley § (1811–1891) – first Governor of Minnesota
 Christopher Sieber (born 1969) – actor
 Dick Siebert § (1912–1978) – college baseball coach
 Gerry Sikorski (born 1948) – member of U.S. Congress
 Clifford D. Simak § (1904–1988) – science-fiction writer
 Richard Simmons (1913–2003) – actor
 George Sitts – convicted murderer
 Slug (born 1973) – rapper
 Roy Smalley § (born 1952) – baseball player
 Jack Smight (1925–2003) – film director
 Bruce Smith (1920–1967) – football player; winner, Heisman Trophy
 Chad Smith (born 1961) – drummer, Red Hot Chili Peppers
 Craig Smith (born 1974) – college basketball coach 
 Edward Everett Smith – 18th Lieutenant Governor of Minnesota
 George Ross Smith (1864–1952) – member of U.S. Congress
 Larry H. Smith (1939–2002) – hockey player
 Lyndon Ambrose Smith – 15th Lieutenant Governor of Minnesota
 Onterrio Smith § (born 1980) – football player
 Phillips Waller Smith (1906–1963) – U.S. Air Force Major General
 Raonall Smith (born 1978) – football player
 Regan Smith § (born 2002) – Olympic swimmer
 Robert Smith § (born 1972) – football player
 Wyatt Smith (born 1977) – hockey player
 Fred Smoot § (born 1979) – football player
 Josiah Snelling § (1782–1828) – first commander of Fort Snelling
 Samuel Snider § (1845–1928) – member of U.S. Congress
 Zach Sobiech (1995–2013) – musician
 Ben Sobieski (born 1979) – football player
 Konrad K. Solberg – 27th Lieutenant Governor of Minnesota
 Kathleen Soliah § (born 1947) – member of the Symbionese Liberation Army
 Gordon Solie (Francis Jonard Labiak) (1929–2000) – wrestling announcer
 Sammy Solis – baseball player
 Jesse Solomon – football player
 Spenser J. Somers § (1972–1990) – author
 Rich Sommer § (born 1978) – actor
 Stephen Sommers § (born 1962) – director
 Gale Sondergaard (1899–1985) – Academy Award-winning actress (1936)
 John Sontag (1861–1893) – outlaw, born in Mankato
 Kevin Sorbo (born 1958) – actor
 Richard K. Sorenson (1924–2004) – sailor
 Alec Soth (born 1969) – photographer
 Ann Sothern § (1909–2001) – actress
 Matt Spaeth – football player
 Allan Spear § (1937–2008) – state legislator and president of the Minnesota Senate
 LaVyrle Spencer – romance novelist
 Lili St. Cyr (Willis Marie Van Schaack) (1918–1999) – ecdysiast
 Paul St. Peter (also known as George C. Cole and Francis C. Cole) (born 1958) – voice actor
 Joan Staley (1940–2019) – actor
 Arlan Stangeland § (1930–2013) – member of U.S. Congress
 Maurice Stans (1908–1998) – U.S. secretary of commerce
 Frank Starkey (1892–1968) – member of U.S. Congress
 Harold Stassen (1907–2001) – 25th Governor of Minnesota
 Ozora P. Stearns § (1831–1896) – U.S. Senator
 Franklin Steele § (1813–1880) – early settler of St. Anthony, Minnesota
 Halvor Steenerson § (1852–1926) – member of U.S. Congress
 Andy Steensma (born 1942) – farmer, mayor, politician
 Heidemarie M. Stefanyshyn-Piper (born 1963) – astronaut
 Will Steger (born 1944) – polar explorer
 Terry Steinbach (born 1962) – Major League Baseball player
 Helen Stenborg (1925–2011) – actor
 Phil Sterner (born 1960) – politician
 Cliff Sterrett – cartoonist
 Todd Steussie – football player
 Frederick Stevens § (1861–1923) – member of U.S. Congress
 John H. Stevens – § (1820–1900) first civilian (non-indigenous) resident of Minneapolis
 Gable Steveson (born 2000) - wrestler for the University of Minnesota, 2020 Summer Olympics gold medalist in Men's Freestyle 125 kg
 Jacob H. Stewart § (1829–1884) – member of U.S. Congress

 Kenny Stills (born 1992) – wide receiver for the Miami Dolphins
 Bob Stinson (Robert Neil Stinson) (1959–1995) – musician
 Tommy Stinson (born 1966) – musician
 Carl Stockdale (1874–1953) – actor
 Cal Stoll (1923–2000) – former coach, Wake Forest, University of Minnesota football
 Erik Stolhanske (born 1968) – comedian
 Horace B. Strait § (1835–1894) – member of U.S. Congress
 Korey Stringer § (1974–2001) – football player
 Eric Strobel (born 1958) – hockey player; 1980 Miracle on Ice hockey-team member
 Chris Strouth (born 1968) – musician, producer, writer and filmmaker 
 Mike Stuart (born 1980) – hockey player
 Scott Studwell – football player
 John Stumpf – chairman and chief executive officer, Wells Fargo
 Terrell Suggs – football player
 George H. Sullivan – 21st Lieutenant Governor of Minnesota
 Clinton Sundberg – actor
 Milt Sunde – football player
 David C. Sutherland III (1949–2005) – Dungeons & Dragons artist
 Steve Sviggum – politician
 Curt Swan (1920–1996) – comic book artist
 Lori Swanson (born 1966) – Minnesota Attorney General
 Nick Swardson (born 1977) – stand-up comedian, actor
 Henry Adoniram Swift § (1823–1869) – 3rd Governor of Minnesota and 3rd Lieutenant Governor of Minnesota
 William Irvin Swoope § (1862–1930) – lawyer and politician
 John Szarkowski (1925–2007) – photographer, historian, director of photography for Museum of Modern Art

T

 Taoyateduta (c. 1810–1863) – chief of the Mdewakanton Sioux tribe
 Kevin Tapani § (born 1964) – baseball player
 Thomas Tapeh § (born 1980) – football player
 Fran Tarkenton § (born 1940) – football player
 A. J. Tarpley (born 1992) – football player
 John Tate (1925–2019) – mathematician; winner, Wolf Prize in Mathematics and the Abel Prize
 James Albertus Tawney § (1855–1919) – member of U.S. Congress
 Glen Taylor – businessperson
 Travis Taylor § (born 1978) – football player
 Maureen Teefy (born 1953) – musical-theatre vocalist and actor
 Henry Teigan § (1881–1941) – politician
 Wayne Terwilliger § (1925–2021) – baseball coach
 Adam Thielen (born 1990) – football player
 Dontarrious Thomas § (born 1980) – football player
 George Thomas (born 1937) – baseball player
 Henry Thomas § (born 1965) – football player
 John Thomas (born 1975) – basketball player
 Butch Thompson (born 1943) – jazz pianist and clarinetist
 Lea Thompson (born 1961) – actor, dancer
 Stew Thornley (born 1955) – author of books on sports history
 Edward John Thye § (1896–1969) – 26th Governor of Minnesota; 31st Lieutenant Governor of Minnesota; U.S. Senator
 Steve Tibbetts § (born 1954) – guitarist
 Mike Tice § (born 1959) – football coach
 Cheryl Tiegs (born 1947) – model
 Mick Tingelhoff § (born 1940) – football player
 Tiny Tim (Herbert Buckingham Khaury) § (1932–1996) – musician
 Lio Tipton (born 1988) – third place, America's Next Top Model Cycle 11
 Mike Todd (1909–1958) – movie producer
 César Tovar § (1940–1994) – baseball player
 Charles A. Towne (1858–1928) – U.S. Senator; member of U.S. Congress
 A. C. Townley § (1880–1959) – socialist
 Jayne Trcka – bodybuilder and actress
 Martin Edward Trench (1869–1927) – sailor, politician
 Ian Truitner (born 1972) – filmmaker, entrepreneur
 Billy Turner (born 1991) – football player
 Taylor Twellman (born 1980) – professional soccer player
 Anne Tyler (born 1941) – novelist

U
 Kenechi Udeze § (born 1983) – football player
 Brenda Ueland (1891–1985) – journalist
 Lenore Ulric (1892–1970) – actor
 Bob Ulrich (born 1944) – businessperson
 Jay Underwood (born 1968) – actor
 Jordis Unga § (born 1982) – singer
 Anne Ursu – journalist, novelist, blogger

V

 John Vachon (1914–1975) – photographer
 Norm Van Brocklin § (1926–1983) – NFL quarterback and Minnesota Vikings coach
 Carl Van Dyke (1881–1919) – member of U.S. Congress
 John Van Dyke § (1807–1878) – politician
 Samuel Rinnah Van Sant § (1844–1936) – 15th Governor of Minnesota
 Shantel VanSanten (born 1985) – actress, model, One Tree Hill
 Sofia Vassilieva (born 1992) – child actor
 Vince Vaughn (born 1970) – actor
 Thorstein Veblen § (1857–1929) – economist, sociologist, author
 Bruce Vento (1940–2000) – member of U.S. Congress
 Jesse Ventura (born 1951) – retired professional wrestler, political commentator, author, actor, and 38th Governor of Minnesota
 Zoilo Versalles § (1939–1995) – baseball player
 John William Vessey Jr. (1922–2016) – Chairman of the Joint Chiefs of Staff
 Jim Vickerman (1931–2021) –  politician, senator
 Frank Viola § (born 1960) – baseball player
 Pamela Vitale § (1953–2005) – murder victim
 Andrew Volstead (1860–1947) – member of U.S. Congress; author of the 1919 National Prohibition Act (known informally as the Volstead Act) 
 Lindsey Vonn (born 1984) – Olympic and world champion skier
 Ana Clara Voog (Rachael Olson) (born 1966) – singer-songwriter, musician, performance artist, visual artist, and writer

W

 Kevin Wacholz (born 1958) – professional wrestler
 James Wakefield § (1825–1910) – 8th Lieutenant Governor of Minnesota; member of U.S. Congress
 Harriet G. Walker § (1841–1917) – president, Northwestern Hospital
 T. B. Walker  § (1840–1928) – lumberman; founder of Minneapolis Public Library; founder of Walker Art Center
 DeWitt Wallace (1889–1981) – publisher; founder of Reader's Digest; philanthropist
 Steve Walsh (born 1966) – football player
 Sean Waltman (born 1972) – podcaster and former professional wrestler
 Tim Walz – politician
 Lou Wangberg (born 1941) – 41st Lieutenant Governor of Minnesota
 John Warne (born 1979) – musician
 Lonnie Warwick – football player
 Cadwallader Washburn § (1818–1882) – businessperson; founder of Washburn Mills
 William D. Washburn § (1831–1912) – U.S. Senator; member of U.S. Congress
 Gene Washington § (born 1947) – football player
 Vin Weber (born 1952) – member of U.S. Congress
 Jon Wefald (born 1937) – educator
 Knud Wefald § (1869–1936) – member of U.S. Congress
 Mark Weigle (born 1967) – singer-songwriter
 Chris Weinke (born 1972) – football player
 Jeff Weise (1988–2005) – high school student who committed murder/suicide
 Paul Wellstone § (1944–2002) – U.S. Senator
 Sheila Wellstone (1944–2002) – advocate for human rights, the environment, and peace; wife of Paul Wellstone
 Carl L. Weschcke (1930–2015) – businessperson; president and owner, Llewellyn Worldwide
 Paul Westerberg (born 1959) – musician
 Wes Westrum (1922–2002) – baseball player
 Jacob Wetterling (1978–1989) – kidnapped, abused, and murdered in 1989; missing until remains were discovered in 2016
 Patty Wetterling § (born 1949) – politician, advocate of children's safety
 Alice Wetterlund (born 1981) - actress and comedian
 Friedrich Weyerhäuser – businessperson
 Lindsay Whalen (born 1982) – WNBA player
 David Wheaton (born 1969) – tennis player
 Blake Wheeler (born 1986) – hockey player
 Ed White – football player
 Milo White § (1833–1912) – member of U.S. Congress
 Minor White (1908–1976) – photographer
 Sammy White § (born 1954) – football player
 Benson Whitney – U.S. Ambassador to Norway
 Richard Widmark (1914–2008) – actor
 Roy Wier § (1888–1963) – member of U.S. Congress
 James Russell Wiggins (1903–2000) – editor; U.S. Ambassador to the United Nations
 Jermaine Wiggins (born 1975) – football player
 Laura Ingalls Wilder § (1867–1957) – novelist
 Zygi Wilf § (born 1950) – football team owner
 Roy Wilkins § (1901–1981) – civil rights leader
 Bud Wilkinson (1916–1994) – football player, coach, and broadcaster
 Morton S. Wilkinson § (1819–1894) – U.S. Senator; member of U.S. Congress
 Warren William (Warren William Krech) (1894–1948) – actor
 Auburn Williams (born 1990) – singer
 Brian Williams (born 1979) – football player
 Kevin Williams (born 1980) – football player
 Moe Williams (born 1974) – football player
 Pat Williams (born 1972) – football player
 Stokley Williams (born 1967) – musician
 Tom Williams (1940–1992) – hockey player
 Walter Jon Williams (born 1953) – writer
 Troy Williamson (born 1983) – football player
 Paul Willson (born 1945) – actor
 August Wilson § (1945–2005) – Pulitzer Prize-winning playwright
 Dan Wilson – musician
 Dorothy Wilson (1909–1998) – actress
 Eugene McLanahan Wilson § (1833–1890) – member of U.S. Congress
 Rainn Wilson § (born 1966) – actor; Guthrie Theater alumnus
 Sheree J. Wilson (born 1958) – actor
 Thomas Wilson § (1827–1910) – member of U.S. Congress
 Wade Wilson § (1959–2019) – football player
 Harold Windingstad (1929–2006) – political activist, farmer
 William Windom § (1827–1891) – U.S. Senator, member of U.S. Congress
 Antoine Winfield (born 1977) – football player
 Dave Winfield (born 1951) – Baseball Hall of Fame player
 Eliza Winston § (1830– date of death unknown) – freed slave
 Roy Winston – football player
 Max Winter § (1903–1996) – football team owner
 Ted Winter (born 1949) – politician, farmer, insurance agent
 Theodore Wirth § (1863–1949) – horticulturalist, Minneapolis Superintendent of Parks; civic planner
 Cory Withrow – football player
 Wally Wood (1927–1981) – comic-book writer, artist, and independent publisher
 Wolfman Jack (Robert Weston Smith) § – radio personality
 Jerome J. Workman Jr. (born 1952) – spectroscopist, editor, author
 Bryan Thao Worra (born 1973) – poet, writer, and journalist
 Al Worthington § (born 1929) – baseball player
 John Wozniak (born 1971) – musician
 Donald O. Wright (1892–1985) – 35th Lieutenant Governor of Minnesota
 Michael Wuertz (born 1978) – baseball player
 Irma Wyman § (born 20th century) – first chief information officer, Honeywell

Y
 Cedric Yarbrough (born 1968) – actor, Reno 911!
Dwight York – stand-up comedian
 Adam Young (born 1986) – musician
Michelle Young (born 1993) - reality television star, The Bachelor Season 25, The Bachelorette Season 18

Z

 Steve Zabel (born 1948) – football player
 Steve Zahn (born 1967) – actor
 Martin Zellar – musician
 Kurt Zellers § (born 1969) – state representative
 Tom Zenk (1958–2017) – former professional wrestler and bodybuilder
 Gary Zimmerman § (born 1961) – football player
 Robert Zimmerman (see Bob Dylan)
 Andrew Zimmern (born 1961) – television personality, chef, food writer
 Cat Zingano (born 1982) – UFC mixed martial artist
 Doug Zmolek (born 1970) – hockey player
 Fred Zollner (1901–1982) – basketball-team owner
 Tay Zonday (born 1982) – musician, prominent YouTuber
 Buck Zumhofe – former professional wrestler
 John M. Zwach (1907–1990) – member of U.S. Congress

Fictional characters

 Riley Anderson, from the Pixar film Inside Out
 Paul Bunyan, folklore logger and voyageur
 Betty Crocker, food brand character
 Marshall Eriksen, from the television sitcom How I Met Your Mother
 Henry Gale, from the television series Lost
 Marge Gunderson, from the film Fargo
 Linda Gunderson, from the animated film Rio.
 Jolly Green Giant, food brand character
 Juno MacGuff, from the film Juno
 Angus MacGyver, from the 1980s television series MacGyver
 Minnehaha, Native American maiden from Samuel Coleridge-Taylor's poem "The Song of Hiawatha" 
 Lester Nygaard, from the first season of Fargo
 Rose Nylund, from the television sitcom The Golden Girls
 Pillsbury Doughboy, food brand character
 Candy Quackenbush, from Clive Barker's The Books of Abarat novel series
 Mary Richards, from the television sitcom The Mary Tyler Moore Show
 Rocky and Bullwinkle, cartoon characters from the animated television series The Adventures of Rocky and Bullwinkle and Friends
 Lou Solverson, from the second season of Fargo
 Molly Solverson, from the second season of Fargo
 Ben Wyatt, from Parks and Recreation

See also

 Lists of Americans

References